Morrolepis is an extinct genus of prehistoric coccolepidid "palaeoniscoid" ray-finned fish that lived during the Late Jurassic and earliest Cretaceous epochs in Europe, Asia and North America. 

The other species were previously referred to the genus Coccolepis. Including M. andrewsi (Woodward, 1891) from the earliest Cretaceous (Berriasian) Purbeck Group, England and M. aniscowitchi (Gorizdor-Kulczycka, 1926) from the late Middle Jurassic-early Late Jurassic (Callovian/Oxfordian) Karabastau Formation of Kazakhstan.

See also

 Prehistoric fish
 List of prehistoric bony fish
 Paleobiota of the Morrison Formation

References

Late Jurassic fish
Morrison fauna
Paleontology in Kazakhstan
Prehistoric chondrostei
Mesozoic fish of Asia